The Royal Swedish Academy of Music, founded in 1771 by King Gustav III, is one of the Royal Academies in Sweden. At the time of its foundation, only one of its co-founder was a professional musician, Ferdinand Zellbell the Younger. The Academy is an independent organization, which acts to promote the artistic, scientific, educational and cultural development of music. Fredrik Wetterqvist is director of the Academy.

The Academy consists of 170 Swedish members belonging to various spheres of the music industry and has a research committee which has been operational since 1980s. They are involved in research on Gustavian music drama, music archaeology, future developments in musical life and music in a multicultural society. The Academy also publishes various biographies, debate books, analytical writings, etc. and has been offering music students scholarships and various prizes for outstanding contributions in the field.

See also 
Royal College of Music, Stockholm
Royal Swedish Opera
Music of Sweden
List of Swedes in music

References

External links 
 The Royal Swedish Academy of Music – Official site
 Joseph Martin Kraus A page dedicated to Joseph Martin Kraus (1756–1792) – "Swedish Mozart", with a list of further links.

1771 establishments in Sweden
1771 in Sweden
Swedish Royal Academies